Zilla is a livetronica band based in Boulder, CO.  It consists of Jamie Janover, Michael Travis and Aaron Holstein.  The group began as a side project for Travis in his time away from the more popular String Cheese Incident.  However, since SCI's hiatus in 2007 Zilla and EOTO have become Travis' main projects.  The band's shows are 100% improvised, as are their two studio recordings.

Discography
 Zilla - 2005
 Egg - 2005
 all iZ - 2006

External links
Zilla Homepage
 Zilla on Myspace
Jamie Janover's Page

Rock music groups from Colorado
Electronic music groups from Colorado
Livetronica music groups